Urozelotes rusticus is a species of ground spider found in both Americas, Africa, Europe, Asia, Australia. Its native area is unknown, but it is most likely Old World.

References

Gnaphosidae
Articles created by Qbugbot
Spiders described in 1872